Udusan is a mountain in Gyeonggi-do, South Korea. It sits between the counties of Yangpyeong and Yeoju.

See also
 List of mountains in Korea

Notes

References 
 

Mountains of Gyeonggi Province
Yeoju
Yangpyeong County
Mountains of South Korea